Saint-Hernin is a commune in the Finistère department of Brittany in north-western France. The historian and librarian Georges Le Rider (1928-2014) was born in Saint-Hernin.

Population
Inhabitants of Saint-Hernin are called in French Saint-Herninois.

Geography

Saint-Hernin lies on the northern slope of the Montagnes Noires (french, Black Mountains). The canal de Nantes à Brest, which is the canalized river Hyères, forms the commune's northern border.

Map

See also
Communes of the Finistère department
Saint Hernin Parish close
Listing of the works of the atelier of the Maître de Tronoën
Listing of the works of the Maître de Laz

References

External links

Official website 

Mayors of Finistère Association 

Communes of Finistère